Lamprosema tumidicostalis is a species of moth of the family Crambidae.  It can be found in India (Madras) .

Its wingspan is 20 mm.

References 

Lamprosema
Moths described in 1908
Moths of Asia